Listed below are the dates and results for the 1982 FIFA World Cup qualification rounds for the Asian and Oceanian zone (AFC and OFC). For an overview of the qualification rounds, see the article 1982 FIFA World Cup qualification.

A total of 21 AFC and OFC teams entered the competition. However, Iran withdrew before the draw was made. The Asian and Oceanian zone was allocated 2 places (out of 24) in the final tournament.

Format
There would be two rounds of play:
 First Round: The remaining 20 teams would be divided into 4 groups. The groups had different rules, as follows:
 Group 1 had 5 teams. The teams played against each other on a home-and-away basis. The group winner would qualify.
 Group 2 had 5 teams. The teams played against each other once in Saudi Arabia. The group winner would qualify.
 Group 3 had 4 teams. The teams played against each other once in Kuwait. The group winner would qualify.
 Group 4 had 6 teams. All matches were played in Hong Kong. There would be four stages of play:
 Classification matches: All teams would be paired up to play preliminary matches to determine group classification.
 Group stage: Based on the results of the classification matches, the 6 teams were divided into 2 groups of 3 teams each. The teams played against each other once. The group winners and runners-up would advance to the semifinals.
 Semifinals: The winner of Group A played against the runner-up of Group B in a single match, and the winner of Group B played against the runner-up of Group A in a single match. The winners would advance to the Final.
 Final: The 2 teams played against each other in a single match. The winner would advance to the Final Round.
Final Round: The 4 teams played against each other on a home-and-away basis. The group winner and runner-up would qualify.

First round

Group 1

 

 

 

 

 

 

 

 

 

 

 

 

 

 

 

 

 

 

 

New Zealand advanced to the Final Round.

Group 2

 

 

 

 

 

 

 

 

 

Saudi Arabia advanced to the Final Round.

Group 3

 

 

 

 

 

Kuwait advanced to the Final Round.

To date, it is last time that South Korea failed to qualify.

Group 4

Classification matches

 

 

Based on the results, China PR, Japan and Macau were placed in Group A, while Hong Kong, Korea DPR and Singapore were placed in Group B.

Group A

 

 

China and Japan advanced to the Group 4 Semifinals.

Group B

 

 

Korea DPR and Hong Kong advanced to the Group 4 Semifinals.

Semifinals

Korea DPR advanced to the Group 4 Final.
 

China PR advanced to the Group 4 Final on penalties.

Final

China PR advanced to the Final Round.

Final round

 

 

 

 

 

 

 

 

 

 

 

Notes

Play-off
At the time, goals scored and head-to-head results were not used to rank teams level on points and goal difference. As China PR and New Zealand finished level on points and goal difference, a play-off on neutral ground was played to determine who would qualify.

Kuwait and New Zealand qualified.

Qualified teams
The following two teams from AFC and OFC qualified for the final tournament.

1 Bold indicates champions for that year. Italic indicates hosts for that year.

Goalscorers
9 goals

 Gary Cole
 Steve Sumner
 Brian Turner

8 goals

 Grant Turner
 Steve Wooddin

5 goals

 Huang Xiangdong
 Abdulaziz Al-Anberi

4 goals

 Gu Guangming
 Faisal Al-Dakhil
 Wynton Rufer

3 goals

 Dave Mitchell
 Rong Zhixing
 Deng Chyan
 Ratu Jone
 Jasem Yaqoub
 Kim Yong-Nam
 Li Yong-Sob
 Mansour Muftah
 Majed Abdullah

2 goals

 John Kosmina
 Eddie Krncevic
 Chen Jingang
 Zuo Shusheng
 Meli Vuilabasa
 Herry Risdianto
 Kazushi Kimura
 Nassir Al-Ghanem
 Fathi Kameel
 Ibrahim Din
 Ricki Herbert
 Li Chang-Ha
 Saud Jassem
 Choi Soon-Ho
 Shait Ahmed Jehad

1 goal

 Murray Barnes
 Ken Boden
 Gary Byrne
 Alan Davidson
 Tony Henderson
 Peter Sharne
 Fouad Bushegir
 Cai Jinbiao
 Chen Xirong
 Shen Xiangfu
 Chang Kuo Chi
 Jyn Tson
 John Morris Williams
 Choi Jork Yee
 Wan Chi Keung
 Wu Kwok Hung
 Hadi Ismanto
 Budi Johannis
 Nazar Ashraf
 Hadi Ahmed
 Adnan Dirjal
 Adel Khudhair
 Hussein Saeed
 Haruhisa Hasegawa
 Hideki Maeda
 Sami Al-Hashash
 Mahboub Juma'a
 Mohammed Karam
 James Wong Chye Fook
 Duncan Cole
 Adrian Elrick
 Keith Mackay
 Billy McClure
 Li Yong-Man
 Ibrahim Khalfan
 Khalid Salman
 Shaye Al Nafeesah
 Ahmed Al Nifawi
 Yousef Aboloya
 Amin Dabo
 Thasmbiayah Pathmanathan
 Choi Jong-Deok
 Hong Sung-Ho
 Lee Kang-Jo
 Lee Tae-Ho
 Oh Seok-Jae
 Piyapong Pue-On
 Khan Thatat Songwuti
 Sompit Suwannapluoh

1 own goal
 Upendran Choy (playing against Indonesia)

See also
1982 FIFA World Cup qualification (UEFA)
1982 FIFA World Cup qualification (CONMEBOL)
1982 FIFA World Cup qualification (CONCACAF)
1982 FIFA World Cup qualification (CAF)

Notes

To date, this was the last time that South Korea failed to qualify for a FIFA World Cup.

References

Qual
Qual
Qual
AFC and OFC
FIFA World Cup qualification (AFC)
FIFA World Cup qualification (OFC)
qual
qual